Charles Plisnier (13 December 1896, Ghlin – 17 July 1952, Brussels) was a Belgian writer from Wallonia.

Biography
He was a Communist in his youth and briefly belonged to the Trotskyist movement in the late 1920s. He disavowed communism, and became a Roman Catholic, remaining nevertheless a Marxist.  He turned to literature, writing family sagas against bourgeois society. Mariages (1936; "Nothing to Chance") deals with the limitations of social conventions; the five-volume Meurtres (1939–41; "Murders") centres on an idealistic tragic hero, Noël Annequin, in his fight against hypocrisy. 

In 1937, he won the Prix Goncourt for Faux passeports, short stories denouncing Stalinism, in the same spirit as Arthur Koestler. He was the first foreigner to receive Prix Goncourt. He was also a Walloon movement activist and at the end of the Walloon National Congress there was a standing ovation after his speech, the assembly then singing La Marseillaise.

Footnotes

Belgian communists
Walloon movement activists
Belgian writers in French
Prix Goncourt winners
Roman Catholic writers
1896 births
1952 deaths